Warral is a small locality south of Tamworth in the New England region of New South Wales, Australia. It lies on the Werris Creek Road and the Main North railway line. A station was located there between 1910 and 1975.

References

Localities in New South Wales
Main North railway line, New South Wales